Opharus corticea is a moth of the family Erebidae. It was described by Francis Walker in 1856. It is found in Venezuela.

Taxonomy
This species was first described by Francis Walker using female specimens from Mr Saunders collection, collected in Venezuela, and named Halysidota corticea. In 1892 Kirby placed this species within the genus Phaegoptera. In 1919  Embrik Strand placed this species within the genus Opharus.

Description 
Walker described the adult female of the species as follows:

References

Opharus
Moths described in 1856
Moths of South America
Taxa named by Francis Walker (entomologist)